Atílio Munari (1901 – 19 October 1941) was born in Santa Maria, Rio Grande do Sul, Brazil.

Biography
He lived near the Sanga da Alemoa, and when he was 14 years old, he lived with the scientist H. Lotz, a German paleontologist, who taught him to collecting and preparing fossils. Many of the fossils collected by him, are now in Rio de Janeiro, Porto Alegre and Santa Maria. Helped a lot of paleontologists who visited the city of Santa Maria. Has contributed considerably to the Geopark of Paleorrota.

In his honor, the city of Santa Maria, received the Atilio Munari street. He was buried in São José Cemetery, near where he was collecting fossils.

References 

 Book Os Fascinantes Caminhos da Paleontologia. Author : Antônio Isaia. Publisher Pallotti. (Portuguese)
 Book: "Cronologia Histórica de Santa Maria e do extinto município de São Martinho." 1787–1933. Vol I. Author: Romeu Beltrão, Publisher Pallotti, 1958. (Portuguese)

Brazilian paleontologists
1901 births
1941 deaths
People from Rio Grande do Sul